The  Atlanta Falcons season was the franchise's 25th season in the National Football League (NFL). Jerry Glanville was hired to be the team’s new coach. The franchise changed their helmets from red to black. Atlanta looked to improve on its 3–13 record from 1989. The team did improve by finishing 5–11, but the Falcons still suffered an eighth consecutive losing season. 1990 started out pretty well for Atlanta, as they beat playoff contenders Houston, New Orleans, and Cincinnati at home. The team sat at 3–4 after their win against Cincinnati. It then lost seven games in a row before winning its last two to end the season. Atlanta went 5–3 at home, but winless on the road, which cost the Falcons a trip to the postseason.

Offseason

NFL draft

Personnel

Staff

Roster

Regular season

Schedule

Standings

References

External links 

Atlanta
Atlanta Falcons seasons
Atlanta